Rhena is a river of Hesse, Germany. It flows into the Neerdar west of Korbach.

See also
List of rivers of Hesse

Rivers of Hesse
Rivers of Germany